75th NYFCC Awards
January 11, 2010

Best Picture:
The Hurt Locker

The 75th New York Film Critics Circle Awards, honoring the best in film for 2009, were announced on 14 December 2009 and presented on 11 January 2010.

Winners

Best Actor

1. George Clooney – Fantastic Mr. Fox and Up in the Air
2. Jeff Bridges – Crazy Heart
3. Jeremy Renner – The Hurt Locker

Best Actress

1. Meryl Streep – Julie & Julia
2. Tilda Swinton – Julia
3. Carey Mulligan – An Education

Best Animated Film

1. Fantastic Mr. Fox
2. Up
3. Coraline

Best Cinematography

1. Christian Berger – The White Ribbon (Das weiße Band)
2. Mauro Fiore – Avatar
3. Roger Deakins – A Serious Man

Best Director

1. Kathryn Bigelow – The Hurt Locker
2. Wes Anderson – Fantastic Mr. Fox
3. Quentin Tarantino – Inglourious Basterds

Best Film

1. The Hurt Locker
2. Up in the Air
3. Fantastic Mr. Fox

Best First Film

 Steve McQueen – Hunger

Best Foreign Language Film

1. Summer Hours (L'heure d'été) • France
2. Broken Embraces (Los abrazos rotos) • Spain
3. Everlasting Moments (Maria Larssons eviga ögonblick) • Sweden

Best Non-Fiction Film

1. Of Time and the City
2. Anvil! The Story of Anvil
3. Tyson

Best Screenplay

1. Armando Iannucci, Jesse Armstrong, Simon Blackwell, and Tony Roche – In the Loop
2. Jason Reitman and Sheldon Turner – Up in the Air
3. Quentin Tarantino – Inglourious Basterds

Best Supporting Actor

1. Christoph Waltz – Inglourious Basterds
2. Christian McKay – Me and Orson Welles
3. Peter Capaldi – In the Loop

Best Supporting Actress

1. Mo'Nique – Precious
2. Vera Farmiga – Up in the Air
3. Anna Kendrick – Up in the Air

Special Award

Andrew Sarris

References

External links
 2009 Awards
 Behind the scenes of the Gotham film critics awards

New York Film Critics Circle Awards
2009 film awards
2009 in American cinema
2009 awards in the United States
2009 in New York City